Sanjoy Bhattacharya, FRAS, is an academic and historian, who is professor in the History of Medicine and Director of the World Health Organisation Collaborating Centre for Global Health Histories, at the University of York.

Career 
Bhattacharya completed his undergraduate studies at St. Stephen's College, Delhi, before earning a Master of Arts degree from Jawaharlal Nehru University, and then a doctorate from the School of Oriental and African Studies in London. He was appointed a Wellcome Trust research fellow at Sheffield Hallam University in 1997, and took up a research fellowship at the University of Oxford four years later; at the same time, he was appointed to a lectureship at University College London, and remained there until 2010, when he became Reader in the History of Medicine at the University of York, where has since been promoted to a professorship and appointed Director of the Centre for Global Health Histories and Director of the World Health Organisation Collaborating Centre for Global Health Histories. He is also editor of the journal Medical History; since 2013, he has been editor of Cambridge University Press's Global Health Histories series, and a co-editor of Orient Blackswan's New Perspectives in South Asian History series. In 2011, Bhattacharya was elected a Fellow of the Royal Asiatic Society of Great Britain and Ireland. Bhattacharya's research focuses on the medical, environmental and social history of South Asia in the 19th and 20th centuries and the modern history of global health programmes.

References 

St. Stephen's College, Delhi alumni
Jawaharlal Nehru University alumni
Alumni of SOAS University of London
Academics of Sheffield Hallam University
Academics of University College London
Academics of the University of York
Living people
Year of birth missing (living people)